Our Ties is a 2022 French drama film co-written, directed and starring Roschdy Zem.

The film was entered into the main competition at the 79th edition of the Venice Film Festival.

Plot

Cast 
 Sami Bouajila as Moussa
 Roschdy Zem as Ryad
 Maïwenn as  Emma
 Rachid Bouchareb as  Salah
 Meriem Serbah as  Samia
 Abel Jafri as  Adil
 Nina Zem as  Nesrine
 Carl Malapa as  Amir

Reception
On Rotten Tomatoes, the film has an approval rating of 60% based on 5 reviews.

References

External links

 
2022 drama films
French drama films  
2020s French-language films
2020s French films
Films directed by Roschdy Zem